is a Japanese politician of the People's New Party, and he was a member of the House of Representatives in the Diet (national legislature). A native of Tokyo and graduate of Keio University, he was elected to the House of Representatives for the first time in 2005 to represent the 2nd District of the Proportional Hokuriku-Shin'etsu Block. He was a representative from 2005 until 2012.

References 
 

1974 births
Living people
People from Tokyo
Keio University alumni
Members of the House of Representatives (Japan)
Democratic Party of Japan politicians
People's New Party politicians
21st-century Japanese politicians